Mother is a 1914 silent film drama directed by Maurice Tourneur and starring Emma Dunn. The film marked Tourneur's first American-made film. Dunn was 39 years old and had starred on Broadway in the play version of the story this film is based on. This film was produced by William A. Brady who also produced the 1910 play. The film has a similar plot to the 1920 Fox film Over the Hill to the Poorhouse.

The Library of Congress has a complete print.

Cast

Emma Dunn as Mrs. Wetherell
Edwin Baker as William
Belle Adair as Sadie
Henri Desforges as Walter
Jane Corcoran as Bess
Lillian Cook as Lenore
Priscilla Dean as Ardath

References

External links

Mother, Australian Film Institute

1914 films
American silent short films
Films directed by Maurice Tourneur
American films based on plays
1914 drama films
1914 short films
Silent American drama films
American black-and-white films
World Film Company films
1910s American films